Moelfre may refer to:

 Moelfre, Anglesey, a village and community on the Isle of Anglesey, Wales, United Kingdom
 Moelfre, Conwy, a place in the county borough of Conwy, Wales, United Kingdom
 Moelfre, Gwynedd, a hill in the  Snowdonia range, in the county of Gwynedd, Wales, United Kingdom
 Moelfre, Powys, a hamlet in the community of Llansilin in the county of Powys, Wales, United Kingdom
 Moelfre island